Neoplecostomus bandeirante is a species of catfish in the family Loricariidae. It is native to South America, where it occurs in the Paraitinguinha River, which is a tributary of the Tietê River, in the vicinity of Salesópolis in the state of São Paulo in Brazil. The species reaches 11 cm (4.3 inches) in standard length. Its specific name, bandeirante, refers to the bandeirantes of colonial Brazil.

References 

bandeirante
Fish described in 2012
Catfish of South America
Freshwater fish of Brazil